Ceratina cobaltina is a species of small carpenter bee in the family Apidae. It is found in Central America.

References

Further reading

 
 

cobaltina
Articles created by Qbugbot
Insects described in 1878